Deadman Island is one of the San Juan Islands in San Juan County, Washington, USA. It is part of the Geese Islets, a collection of rocky islands and reefs near the southwest shore of Lopez Island.

Conservation

Deadman Island is an oystercatcher nesting site and is also a seal haulout.  it was being considered a possible location for the reintroduction of
the Golden Paintbrush plant.

The island is owned by the Nature Conservancy and public visitation is generally not allowed. It is used as a research site by the Friday Harbor Laboratories.

See also

References

External links
 aerial photo of Deadman Island from the Washington state Department of Ecology

San Juan Islands
Uninhabited islands of Washington (state)